Otto (c. 970–1012) was the duke of Lower Lorraine in Germany from 993 until his death. He was the son of Charles, son of King Louis IV of France, and his first wife, Adelaide of Troyes.

When his father left the duchy to fight Hugh Capet for the throne of France in 987, he became regent in Lower Lorraine when still apparently under twenty. Charles was defeated definitively in 991 and died two years later a prisoner in Orléans.  Otto then succeeded into the full dukedom. In 1002, at the death of the Holy Roman Emperor Otto III, he was one of the loyal nobles who accompanied his body from Paterno to Aachen. According to the Chronica of Sigebert de Gembloux, he died in 1006, but he seems to be alive as late as 1012, when Count Godfrey II of Verdun succeeded to the duchy.

Sources
 Settipani, Christian. La préhistoire des Capétiens: 481-987. 1993. 

Dukes of Lower Lorraine
970s births
1012 deaths
Regents of Lorraine